Johan Cardoen is a Belgian scientist and businessman. He is Managing Director of VIB and Board Member of FlandersBio. He obtained a PhD in biology at the Katholieke Universiteit Leuven (Leuven) in 1987.

Johan Cardoen has worked for CropDesign between 1999 and 2012. He has spent most of his career in agricultural biotechnology companies such as Plant Genetic Systems, Hoechst Schering AgrEvo GmbH and Aventis CropScience.

Sources
 Johan Cardoen (PDF)
 CropDesign sluit miljoenen-contract met BASF Plant Science 

Belgian businesspeople
Flemish scientists
Living people
KU Leuven alumni
Sanofi people
Year of birth missing (living people)